Alberto Forelli (born 17 July 1946) is an Argentine former swimmer. He competed in three events at the 1968 Summer Olympics.

References

1946 births
Living people
Argentine male swimmers
Olympic swimmers of Argentina
Swimmers at the 1968 Summer Olympics
Sportspeople from Córdoba, Argentina